Stuart Paul O'Neal is an American politician who is a former member of the North Carolina House of Representatives, who represented the 6th District from 2022 to 2023. He previously served as a member of the Currituck County Board of Commissioners from 1994 to 2006 and again from 2008 to 2016. He was appointed to the state house to succeed Bobby Hanig who resigned to accept an appointment to the North Carolina Senate.

Electoral history

2012

2008

References

Living people
People from Currituck County, North Carolina
21st-century American politicians
County commissioners in North Carolina
Republican Party members of the North Carolina House of Representatives
1962 births